Wa Wa Nee is the debut studio album by Australian pop group Wa Wa Nee. Wa Wa Nee peaked at No. 29 in Australia and was certified platinum.

The album produced four top twenty singles in Australia, including "Stimulation", which peaked at No. 2.

At the 1986 Countdown Australian Music Awards the album was nominated for Best Debut Album.

Track listing

Personnel 
 Mark Gray – bass
 Chris Sweeney – drums, percussion
 Steve Williams – guitar
 Paul Gray – keyboard, vocals
 Peter Bondy – synthesizer
 Keith Casey – percussion

Charts

Certifications

References 

1986 debut albums
Wa Wa Nee albums
CBS Records albums